The Whip (Spanish:El látigo) is a 1939 Mexican adventure film directed by and starring José Bohr. It also featured Elena D'Orgaz, Domingo Soler.

Cast
 José Bohr as Rafael - El Látigo 
 Elena D'Orgaz as Carmelita  
 Domingo Soler as Tío Antonio  
 Julián Soler as Andrés  
 Aurora Walker as Rosalía  
 Ernesto Finance as Don Fernando Montero  
 Guillermo Cantú Robert as Raúl Montero  
 Carlos López Moctezuma as Antonio  
 Pepe del Río as Raúl - niño  
 Consuelo Lezama as Doña Enriqueta  
 Mary Darson as Rosa

References

Bibliography 
 Toledo, Nelson. Patagonia Y Antartica, Personajes HistóRicos. Palibrio, 2011.

External links 
 

1939 films
1939 adventure films
Mexican adventure films
1930s Spanish-language films
Films directed by José Bohr
Mexican black-and-white films
1930s Mexican films